The 2018 Lucas Oil Late Model Dirt Series is the 13th season of the Lucas Oil Late Model Dirt Series, a national touring series for dirt late models owned & operated by Lucas Oil. The series began with the Super Bowl of Racing at Golden Isles Speedway on February 2, and will end with the Dirt Track World Championship at Portsmouth Raceway Park on October 20.

Teams and drivers

Complete schedule

Schedule

MavTV, CBS, CBS Sports Network and NBCSN will broadcast select races on television. Of those select races, MavTV will have live coverage of the Show-Me 100  while the rest will be delayed across the 4 networks. LucasOilRacing.TV and Dirt on DIRT will also broadcast select races with live video coverage.

 ≠ - the race was postponed or canceled
 ≈ - will state if the race is not for championship points

Schedule notes and changes
 - the Buckeye Spring 50 at Atomic Speedway (March 16) was postponed to April 13 due to cold temperatures.
 - the 21st Annual Indiana Icebreaker at Brownstown Speedway (March 17) was postponed to April 14 due to cold temperatures. The rescheduled race was canceled due to heavy rain.
 - the Spring Thaw at Volunteer Speedway (March 22) was canceled due to weather conditions. 
 - the Bad Boy 98 at Batesville Motor Speedway (April 6 & 7) was canceled due to weather conditions.
 - the Steel Valley 50 at Sharon Speedway (April 20) was postponed to July 2 due to saturated grounds & cold temperatures.
 - the 32nd Annual Ralph Latham Memorial at Florence Speedway (May 5) was postponed to August 8 due to heavy rain.
 - the Go 50 at I-80 Speedway (May 20) was postponed to July 19 due to rain.
 - the Salute to the Troops 75 at LaSalle Speedway (June 1 & 2) was canceled.

Results and standings

Races

References

Lucas Oil Late Model Dirt Series